Ballon-Saint Mars is a commune in the department of Sarthe, western France. The municipality was established on 1 January 2016 by merger of the former communes of Ballon and Saint-Mars-sous-Ballon.

Notable people
 Wynebald de Ballon, Anglo-Norman magnate
 Hamelin de Ballon, Anglo-Norman magnate

See also 
Communes of the Sarthe department

References 

Communes of Sarthe
Populated places established in 2016
2016 establishments in France